was a district located in central Iyo Province (Ehime Prefecture) until 1878. In the 7th century, under the  system, Kume District was established. In 701, under the  system, Kume District is supposed to have been established. Due to the 1878 Land Reforms, the district merged with Onsen District and thereby dissolved.

References

See also
List of dissolved districts of Japan
Kume District(Okayama Prefecture)
Kume District, Hōki

Kume District